Mind Pollution (The First Installment) is a various artists compilation album released in 1991 by Words of Warning. The album's sequel Mind Pollution 2 was released in 1993 by the same label and contains a majority of the tracks from this collection.

Track listing

Personnel
Adapted from the Mind Pollution (The First Installment) liner notes.

Release history

References

External links 
 Mind Pollution (The First Installment) at Discogs (list of releases)

1991 compilation albums